Mark Knowles and Daniel Nestor were the defending champions but only Knowles competed that year with Brian MacPhie.

Knowles and MacPhie lost in the first round to Jonas Björkman and Todd Woodbridge.

Donald Johnson and Jared Palmer won in the final 6–3, 4–6, 6–3 against Björkman and Woodbridge.

Seeds

  Jonas Björkman /  Todd Woodbridge (final)
  Donald Johnson /  Jared Palmer (champions)
  Wayne Black /  Kevin Ullyett (quarterfinals)
  Sjeng Schalken /  Sandon Stolle (quarterfinals)

Draw

External links
 2001 If Stockholm Open Doubles Draw

Doubles
2001 Stockholm Open